François Sabatier (born in 1945) is a French musicologist, music historian and music educator.

Biography 
François Sabatier studied music history and musicology at the Conservatoire de Paris and the Paris-Sorbonne University.

The author of books on the relationship between music, literature and the fine arts, Sabatier also participates in the writing of notices in musical encyclopedias and articles in musicology journals. He is the editor of L'Orgue magazine and a member of the Organs committee of the City of Paris.

In 1996, he won the grand prix des Muses for Miroirs de la musique.

Since 1982, he has been a professor of art and civilization and music history at the Conservatoire de Lyon.

Publications 
 Books
 Miroirs de la musique ; la musique et ses correspondances avec la littérature et les beaux-arts de la Renaissance aux Lumières ; XVe - XVIIIe siècles, vol. I, Fayard, col. Les Indispensables de la musique, Paris, 1998, 672 p. 
 Miroirs de la musique ; XIXe - XXe siècles, vol. II, Fayard, Paris, 1998, 744 p. 
 La Musique dans la prose française ; des Lumières à Marcel Proust, Fayard, Paris, 2004, 748 p. 
 Petit dictionnaire de la poésie mélomane ; musique et poésie en France de 1800 à 1950, Zurfluh, series Le Temps musical, Bourg-la-Reine, 1997, 159 p. 
 César Franck et l'orgue, Presses universitaires de France, series Que sais-je ?, 1982, 127 p. 
 Articles in collective publications
 Henri Mulet et al. in Grove Dictionary of Music and Musicians, Oxford Music Online, 2010
 Pierre Cochereau et al., in Guide de la musique d'orgue, dir. Gilles Cantagrel, Paris, 1991, 
 25 ans CNSMD Lyon, dir. François Sabatier, éditions Symétrie, Paris, 2005, 272 p. 
 L'Orgue, dir. François Sabatier, n° 247-248 and préc., éditions Symétrie, Paris, 2010, 272 p. 
 Le Guide de la Musique d'Orgue, dir. Gilles Cantagrel, Paris, Fayard, series Les indispensables de la musique, 2012

References

External links 
 François Sabatier on Symétrie
 François Sabatier
 François Sabatier on Fayard
 François SABATIER, Miroirs de la musique

20th-century French musicologists
21st-century French musicologists
Music historians
French music educators
Conservatoire de Paris alumni
Paris-Sorbonne University alumni
Academic staff of the Conservatoire de Paris
French classical organists
French male organists
1945 births
Living people
21st-century organists
21st-century French male musicians
Male classical organists